Sir Thomas Dale (died 1619) was a British naval commander and deputy governor of the Virginia Colony.

Thomas Dale may also refer to:
Thomas Henry Dale (1846–1912), U.S. congressman from Pennsylvania
Thomas Dale High School, named for the naval commander
Thomas Dale (priest) (1797–1870), Anglican Dean of Rochester, poet and theologian
T. Lawrence Dale (1884–1959), English architect
Thomas Pelham Dale (1821–1892), English Anglo-Catholic ritualist priest
Thomas Francis Dale (1848–1923), English army chaplain and author on fox hunting and polo

See also
Thomas Daley (disambiguation)